Mourning for Anna is a Canadian drama film, directed by Catherine Martin and released in 2010. The film stars Guylaine Tremblay as Françoise, a woman struggling to recover emotionally after the murder of her daughter Anna.

The film's cast also includes Denis Bernard, Paule Baillargeon, François Papineau and Gilles Renaud.

Critical response
The film was named to the Toronto International Film Festival's year-end Canada's Top Ten list for 2010. The film received two Prix Jutra nominations at the 13th Jutra Awards, for Best Actress (Tremblay) and Best Cinematography (Michel La Veaux).

References

External links

2010 films
Canadian drama films
Films directed by Catherine Martin
French-language Canadian films
2010s Canadian films